Hikvision Football Indoor Arena is indoor arena in Marijampolė, mainly used for football. For sponsorship reasons from 2011 to December 2019 was called ARVI maniežas (Indoor Arena).

Between the 2011 and 2019 seasons the stadium was named ARVI Football Arena after the sponsoring rights were bought by ARVI Enterprises Group.

11 December 2019 reports that ARVI Group will no longer support Sūduva club. There were notes and signboards bearing the name of a former sponsor. The ARVi Arena has been renamed the Marijampolė Football Arena (at least temporarily until another sponsor appears).

Also
 Sūduva Stadium
 FK Sūduva Marijampolė

References

External links
 Official website (Marijampolė Football Indoor Arena)
 alyga.lt official page
 Stadiums in Lithuania. Worldstadiums.com.

Indoor arenas in Lithuania
Buildings and structures in Marijampolė